The following is a list of railroads owned by Genesee & Wyoming.  Genesee & Wyoming owns or leases 122 railroads across North America, the United Kingdom and Europe.

North America

Other
 Freightliner Group
 Rotterdam Rail Feeding

References

External links

 Genesee & Wyoming Inc.

Genesee & Wyoming